Ruapehu may refer to:
 Mount Ruapehu, an active volcano, the highest mountain in the North Island of New Zealand
 Ruapehu District, the local government area that covers much land generally west and south of Mount Ruapehu, mostly in the headwaters of the Whanganui River
 SS Ruapehu, a 340-passenger steam ship, built in 1901 and wrecked in 1930. Its main route was London to Auckland and Wellington and back; took the New Zealand Tunnelling Company into war